The Rascoe House was a historic house at 702 Main Street in Searcy, Arkansas.  It was a single story wood-frame structure, with a gabled roof, weatherboard siding, and a foundation of brick piers.  It was built about 1915, and was one a few surviving examples in White County of a vernacular central-passage house from that period.

The house was listed on the National Register of Historic Places in 1992.  It has been listed as destroyed in the Arkansas Historic Preservation Program database, and was delisted in 2018.

See also
National Register of Historic Places listings in White County, Arkansas

References

Houses on the National Register of Historic Places in Arkansas
Houses completed in 1915
Houses in Searcy, Arkansas
National Register of Historic Places in Searcy, Arkansas
Former National Register of Historic Places in Arkansas
Demolished buildings and structures in Arkansas
1915 establishments in Arkansas
Central-passage houses